Lalbijo is an Indian film director, writer, and commercial ad maker. He made his directional debut with the Malayalam - Tamil-Hindi multlingual suspense-thriller The Big Bang (2019).

Filmography

Short  films 

 As director

 As Art assistant director

References

 
 

 
 

Malayali people
Film directors from Kochi
Malayalam film directors
Tamil film directors
Living people
1982 births